Kenneth James Smith  (born 11 August 1941) is a New Zealand motor racing driver, who won the New Zealand Grand Prix in 1976, 1990, and 2004.

Smith first competed in motor racing in 1958, winning the New Zealand Hill Climb championship when he was 16. He progressed to single seater racing in 1962, first driving a Lola March T, Formula Junior car. Later he raced in Formula Ford, Formula 5000, Formula Pacific, Formula Mondial, and Toyota Racing Series among others

Smith won the Gold Star Drivers Award in the 1975–1976, 1983–1984, 1984–1985, 1986–1987 and 1989–1990 seasons. In 2011 Smith won the Formula 5000 Revival championship for the third time. As well as his victories in New Zealand, Smith also won the Penang Grand Prix three times, the Selangor Grand Prix twice, and the Malaysian Grand Prix once.

Honours and awards 
Smith was appointed a Member of the Order of the British Empire in the 1987 Queen's Birthday Honours, for services to motorsport, and in 1995 was inducted into the New Zealand Motorsport Hall of Fame. In 2008 he received the Motorsport Personality of the Year award. In 2010 he received a Motorsport New Zealand Special Award given in recognition of his pivotal role in motorsport.

Racing Record

NZ F5000 Tasman Revival Series

 * Season Still in progress
 ** Needed to compete at all rounds to be classified for points

Complete Toyota Racing Series results 
(key) (Races in bold indicate pole position) (Races in italics indicate fastest lap)

References

External links
Ken Smith Motorsport
Motorsport New Zealand
Driver Database stats

1941 births
Living people
New Zealand racing drivers
Formula Ford drivers
Toyota Racing Series drivers
New Zealand Members of the Order of the British Empire
M2 Competition drivers